The 2018 Deutsche Tourenwagen Masters was the thirty-second season of premier German touring car championship and also nineteenth season under the moniker of Deutsche Tourenwagen Masters since the series' resumption in 2000. 2018 would be the final season for the traditional 4.0-litre V8 naturally-aspirated engine package that debuted in the inaugural reborn season; as the brand new engine package has been introduced for the following season as part of the "Class One Project" prospect with Japanese Super GT GT500 cars. 2018 also marked the final season for Mercedes-Benz in DTM due to Mercedes-Benz departing to FIA Formula E from the 2019–20 season and thus ended its 19 year participation.

Gary Paffett won his second title at the final round of the season with a third place finish, beating previous champion René Rast by four points despite a late charge to six consecutive wins by Rast, a new series record.
Paffett became the second non-German driver to have won more than one DTM driver title, and thus repeating Swedish driver Mattias Ekström's feat in 2004 and 2007 seasons.

Mercedes-Benz won the manufacturer's championship for the first time since 2010.

Rule changes
Aerodynamic downforce aids, such as side winglets and side fences, has been enforced to all cars, in order to improve competition.
The quantity of engine components a driver may use during the season has been increased from seven complete engines during the entire season, to a new system where each of the engine components are combined. Therefore, in 2018, each driver is permitted to use up to eight set engines.
The additional wildcard entry is introduced for the first time ever, but ineligible for championship points even if they finish in top 10.

Calendar

The provisional ten event calendar was announced on 24 November 2017, and later finalized on 18 December 2017.

Calendar changes
 The races in Great Britain and Italy are scheduled to return to the DTM schedule for the first time since 2013 and 2010 respectively. On 6 December 2017 it was confirmed that the British round would be held at Brands Hatch, on the circuit's GP layout as opposed to the Indy layout of previous DTM races. Moscow Raceway was dropped from the 2018 schedule. For the first time, Misano will host the round in Italy, as a night-time event. The Lausitzring round will revert to full road course layout after last used in 2004.

Teams and drivers
The following manufacturers, teams and drivers competed in the 2018 Deutsche Tourenwagen Masters. All teams competed with tyres supplied by Hankook.

Driver changes
Mattias Ekström left the series after eighteen years, but remains with Audi via its FIA World Rallycross Championship programme. 2017 Blancpain GT Series driver Robin Frijns will make his DTM début with Audi Sport. In addition, the two-time champion made a one-off appearance in the 2018 season opener in Hockenheim with an additional Audi RS 5 to mark his retirement from the series.
Philipp Eng and Joel Eriksson – both members of BMW's junior team – joined BMW Team RBM, to partner Canadian Bruno Spengler. After five years with BMW Motorsport, Maxime Martin left the marque, and its DTM programme after four years to join Aston Martin Racing in the FIA World Endurance Championship for the 2018–19 season. Tom Blomqvist will also leave the series after three years, but remains with BMW Motorsport via its Formula E and GT programmes.
 After spending two years in Formula One with Manor and Sauber, Pascal Wehrlein returned to the DTM with Mercedes-AMG's HWA Team. After a one-year sabbatical, Daniel Juncadella also returned to the DTM with HWA. Robert Wickens left the series after six years to join Schmidt Peterson Motorsports in the IndyCar Series for the 2018 season. Maro Engel left the series after one season to focus solely on Formula E.
Former Williams Formula One driver, two-time CART champion and four-time Paralympic gold medallist Alex Zanardi made his DTM début with BMW Motorsport at Misano World Circuit Marco Simoncelli as a guest driver.
Five-time World Rally Champion Sébastien Ogier made his DTM début with HWA Team as a guest driver at the Red Bull Ring.

Results

Championship standings
Scoring system
Points were awarded to the top ten classified finishers as follows:

Additionally, the top three placed drivers in qualifying also received points:

Drivers' championship

† — Driver retired, but was classified as he completed 75% of the winner's race distance.

Teams' championship

Manufacturers' championship

References

External links

  

Deutsche Tourenwagen Masters seasons
Deutsche Tourenwagen Masters